Jill C. Horstead (born May 1, 1967) is a former competition swimmer who represented Canada in international events during the 1980s.

Competitive career
As a 16-year-old at the 1983 Pan American Games in Caracas, Venezuela, she placed fourth in the 200-metre butterfly with a time of 2:17.13, finishing behind Mary T. Meagher, Tracy Caulkins and Marie Moore.  She won a bronze medal in the 200-metre butterfly at the 1985 Pan Pacific Swimming Championships in Tokyo (time: 2:13.46), and another bronze in the 200-metre butterfly at the 1986 Commonwealth Games in Edinburgh (time: 2:14.53).

Horstead competed in the 1984 Summer Olympics in Los Angeles, where she advanced to the B Final of the women's 200-metre butterfly, clocking a time of 2:13.49 and finishing first in the B Final consolation heat (ninth overall).

Horstead later attended the University of Florida in Gainesville, Florida, and swam for coach Randy Reese's Florida Gators swimming and diving team in National Collegiate Athletic Association (NCAA) and Southeastern Conference (SEC) competition from 1987 to 1990.  During her college swimming career, she earned All-American honors in the 200-yard butterfly and the 400-yard medley relay.  She graduated from the University of Florida with bachelor's and master's degrees in accounting in 1990 and 1991, respectively.

Personal life
Horstead and her husband Greg McIntosh have two children, Brooke McIntosh (born January 5, 2005) and Summer McIntosh (born August 18, 2006), both successful athletes in their own right. Brooke, a pair skater, competed at the 2020 Winter Youth Olympics and won the bronze medal at the 2022 World Junior Figure Skating Championships. Summer followed in her mother's footsteps as a swimmer, competing at the 2020 Summer Olympics and becoming a double World champion, including in her mother's favoured discipline, the 200 m butterfly.

See also
 List of University of Florida alumni
 List of University of Florida Olympians

References

1967 births
Living people
Canadian female butterfly swimmers
Florida Gators women's swimmers
Olympic swimmers of Canada
Swimmers from Toronto
Swimmers at the 1983 Pan American Games
Swimmers at the 1984 Summer Olympics
Commonwealth Games bronze medallists for Canada
Swimmers at the 1986 Commonwealth Games
Commonwealth Games medallists in swimming
Pan American Games competitors for Canada
20th-century Canadian women
Medallists at the 1986 Commonwealth Games